Liturgiam authenticam (titled: De usu linguarum popularium in libris liturgiae Romanae edendis) is an instruction of the Congregation for Divine Worship and the Discipline of the Sacraments, dated 28 March 2001.

This instruction included the requirement that, in translations of the liturgical texts or of the Bible, "the original text, insofar as possible, must be translated integrally and in the most exact manner, without omissions or additions in terms of their content, and without paraphrases or glosses. Any adaptation to the characteristics or the nature of the various vernacular languages is to be sober and discreet." (n. 20)

Use of the Nova Vulgata 

Liturgiam authenticam established the Nova Vulgata as "the point of  reference as regards the delineation of the canonical text." Concerning the translation of liturgical texts, the instruction states:

However, the instruction precises (n. 24) that translations should not be made from the Nova Vulgata, but "must be made directly from the original texts, namely the Latin, as regards the texts of ecclesiastical composition, or the Hebrew, Aramaic, or Greek, as the case may be, as regards the texts of Sacred Scripture[.]" Therefore, the instruction does not recommend a translation of the Bible or of the liturgy based upon the Latin Nova Vulgata; the Nova Vulgata must simply being used as an "auxiliary tool" (n. 24).

Reactions 
The Catholic Biblical Association reacted negatively to the publication of the instruction. In reaction to this, Cardinal Medina wrote in Notitiae to answer criticisms and misunderstandings concerning the instruction.

Aftermath 
In December 2016, Pope Francis authorized a commission to study Liturgiam authenticam.

See also
 Magnum principium
 Mass of Paul VI § Revision of the English translation
Nova Vulgata

References

External links
Text of the instruction (Latin)
Text of the instruction (English)

Further reading 

 
 
 Cardinal Estévez's Response to Criticism of Liturgiam Authenticam

Catholic liturgy
Documents of the Congregation for Divine Worship and the Discipline of the Sacraments
Translation
21st-century Catholicism